Mesorhizobium albiziae is a bacterium from the genus of Mesorhizobium which was isolated from a subtropical region in China.

References

External links
Type strain of Mesorhizobium albiziae at BacDive -  the Bacterial Diversity Metadatabase

Phyllobacteriaceae
Bacteria described in 2007